Shayileh (also Romanized as Shāyīleh; also known as Shāhīlān) is a village in Qalayi Rural District, Firuzabad District, Selseleh County, Lorestan Province, Iran. At the 2006 census, its population was 30, in 5 families.

References 

Towns and villages in Selseleh County